Erik Bøgh  (17 June 1822 – 17 August 1899) was a Danish journalist, playwright and songwriter. From 1881 to 1899 he worked at the Royal Danish Theatre.

Bøgh authored the one-act musical comedy Valbygaasen (The Goose of Valby), which was first performed in Copenhagen in 1856. Bøgh died in Copenhagen.

References

External links
 
 

Danish composers
Male composers
Danish songwriters
1822 births
1899 deaths
Writers from Copenhagen
Danish male dramatists and playwrights
19th-century Danish dramatists and playwrights
19th-century male writers
19th-century male musicians
19th-century musicians
Burials at the Garrison Cemetery, Copenhagen